Evangelista Tornioli, O.S.B. (1570–1630) was a Catholic prelate who served as Bishop of Città di Castello (1616–1630).

Biography
Evangelista Tornioli was born in Perugia, Italy in 1570 and ordained a priest in the Order of Saint Benedict.
On 23 March 1616, he was appointed during the papacy of Pope Urban VIII as Bishop of Città di Castello.
He served as Bishop of Città di Castello until his death on 27 November 1630.

Episcopal succession
While bishop, he was the principal co-consecrator of:
Michele Bonzi, Bishop of Ravello e Scala (1617); 
Alfonso Sacrati, Bishop of Comacchio (1617); 
Fabrizio Landriani, Bishop of Pavia (1617); 
Alessandro Scappi, Bishop of Satriano e Campagna (1618); 
Ippolito Borghese (bishop), Bishop of Montalcino (1618); and
Marsilio Peruzzi, Archbishop of Chieti (1618).

References

External links and additional sources
 (for Chronology of Bishops) 
 (for Chronology of Bishops) 
 (for Chronology of Bishops) 

17th-century Italian Roman Catholic bishops
Bishops appointed by Pope Urban VIII
1570 births
1630 deaths
Benedictine bishops
People from Perugia
People from Città di Castello